"Zero to Sixty" is a song recorded by Canadian country group Thomas Wade & Wayward. It was released in 1996 as the second single from their debut album, Thomas Wade & Wayward. It peaked at number 8 on the RPM Country Tracks chart in November 1996.

Chart performance

References

1996 songs
1996 singles
Thomas Wade (singer) songs